The Cuyler Baronetcy, of St John's Lodge in Welwyn in the County of Hertford, was a title in the Baronetage of the United Kingdom.  It was created on 29 October 1814 for General Cornelius Cuyler. The title became extinct on the death of the fifth Baronet in 1947.

Sir Cornelius Cuyler, 1st Baronet, was born in Albany, New York on 31 October 1740, the son of Cornelius Cuyler and Catalyntie Schuyler, she is a descendant of the Schuyler family. His brother Abraham was the last British appointed Mayor of Albany, New York, and Abraham's son Jacob Cuyler became a British Army officer who was instrumental getting the 1820 Settlers to South Africa.

Cuyler baronets, of St John's Lodge (1814)
General Sir Cornelius Cuyler, 1st Baronet (1740–1819)
Sir Charles Cuyler, 2nd Baronet (1794–1862)
Sir Charles Henry Johnes Cuyler, 3rd Baronet (1826–1885)
Sir Charles Cuyler, 4th Baronet (1867–1919)
Sir George Hallifax Cuyler, 5th Baronet (1876–1947)

References

External links

Extinct baronetcies in the Baronetage of the United Kingdom
Cuyler family
Schuyler family